Fredkin's paradox concerns the negative correlation between the difference between two options and the difficulty of deciding between them. Developed further, the paradox constitutes a major challenge to the possibility of pure instrumental rationality.

Proposed by Edward Fredkin, it reads: "The more equally attractive two alternatives seem, the harder it can be to choose between them—no matter that, to the same degree, the choice can only matter less." Thus, a decision-making agent might spend the most time on the least important decisions.

An intuitive response to Fredkin's paradox is to calibrate decision-making time with the importance of the decision: to calculate the cost of optimizing into the optimization, a version of the value of information. However, this response is self-referential and spawns a new, recursive paradox: the decision-maker must now optimize the optimization of the optimization, and so on.

See also
 Buridan's ass
 Decision theory
 Cybernetics
 Parkinson's law of triviality
 Tyranny of small decisions
 What the Tortoise Said to Achilles

References

Decision-making paradoxes